Ferenc Gönczi (29 September 1935 – 16 August 2009) was a Hungarian sports shooter. He competed in the 50 metre pistol event at the 1964 Summer Olympics.

References

External links
 

1935 births
2009 deaths
Hungarian male sport shooters
Olympic shooters of Hungary
Shooters at the 1964 Summer Olympics
Sportspeople from Borsod-Abaúj-Zemplén County